Asphalto is a former settlement in Kern County, California. Asphalto still appeared on maps as of 1932.

History
Originally the site of the Aguaje de La Brea a watering place on El Camino Viejo.  The site has fossils in the asphalt deposits here, similar to other places in the vicinity of McKittrick.   A post office operated at Asphalto from 1893 to 1894, and from 1898 to 1900, when service was transferred to McKittrick.

References

Former settlements in Kern County, California
Former populated places in California
El Camino Viejo